Lan (Polish: łan ; German: Lahn; Latin: laneus) is an old unit of field measurement used in Poland. Since the 13th century, its value has varied from one location to another. A greater łan (also Franconian, King's, Old Polish) consisted of 43.2 morgs = 23 to 28 hectares. A lesser łan (Chełmno łan) was 30 morg ≈ 17,955 hectare.

The term eventually  derives from German Lehen, "fee" (feudal land tenure). The term łan was also used to indicate an average size of a peasant's tenured farm. Łan was further subdivided into zagony ("belts") and further into skiby ("slices").

In medieval times the size of a łan was anywhere between 3 and 50 hectares, but from the 13th century to 1857 in Great Lesser Poland (with Podkarpacie), the Franconian Łan was consistently used.

References

Units of area
Agriculture in Poland
Science and technology in Poland